Freyberg may refer to:

Barbara Freyberg, Baroness Freyberg (died 1973), British peeress
Bernard Freyberg, 1st Baron Freyberg (1889–1963), New Zealand's most famous soldier and military commander 
Paul Richard Freyberg, 2nd Baron Freyberg (1923–1993), British peer 
Valerian Freyberg, 3rd Baron Freyberg (born 1970), British peer

See also
Baron Freyberg
Freiberg (disambiguation)
Freiburg (disambiguation)
Freyberg High School
Freyburg (disambiguation)
Friberg
Fribourg (disambiguation)